Football in Sri Lanka is mainly played at a semi-professional and recreational level. Despite not being as well-regarded as the country's cricket team, football is the third biggest sport in Sri Lanka (after cricket and rugby union). The Sri Lanka national football team uses the 25,000-capacity Sugathadasa Stadium for their home games.

Governing Body

The Football Sri Lanka is the governing body for football in the country. The association administers the national football team as well as the Sri Lanka Super League.

Competitions

League
Sri Lanka Super League (1st tier)
Sri Lanka Champions League (2nd tier)
Division I (3rd tier)
Division II (4th tier)
Division III (5th tier)

Cup
Sri Lanka FA Cup
Ceylon Provincial League

References